The 1905 Liverpool Everton by-election was held on 22 February 1905 after the resignation due to ill health of the incumbent Conservative MP Sir John Archibald Willox.  It was retained by the Conservative candidate John Harmood-Banner.

References

1905 elections in the United Kingdom
1905 in England
Everton, 1905
1900s in Liverpool